

This is a list of the National Register of Historic Places listings in Jefferson County, Tennessee.

This is intended to be a complete list of the properties and districts on the National Register of Historic Places in Jefferson County, Tennessee, United States.  Latitude and longitude coordinates are provided for many National Register properties and districts; these locations may be seen together in a map.

There are 13 properties and districts listed on the National Register in the county.

See also National Register of Historic Places listings in Hamblen County, Tennessee for additional properties in White Pine, a city that spans the county line.

Current listings

|}

Former listings
One other property was once listed, but has since been removed.

|}

See also

 List of National Historic Landmarks in Tennessee
 National Register of Historic Places listings in Tennessee

References

Jefferson
 
Buildings and structures in Jefferson County, Tennessee